Estádio Leonardo Vinagre da Silveira, commonly known as Estádio da Graça, is an association football stadium located in Cruz das Armas neighborhood, João Pessoa, Paraíba, Brazil.

History 
The first game at the stadium was played during his inauguration, on January 9, 1944, when Dolaport and Santa Cruz drew 2-2. The first goal of the stadium was scored by Dolaport's Odilon, during the 17th minute of the game.

During the April 14, 2002 Campeonato do Nordeste game between Botafogo-PB and Sport, the stadium reached its highest attendance ever: approximately seven thousand people watched the game.

On July 7, 2008, the stadium's most ambitious reformation started, with the purpose to adequate it to FIFA's and Supporter's Statute's  regulations. The stadium area was expanded from 1,419 m² to 2,118 m². The works were concluded on March 27, 2010, costing approximately R$3,5 million.

Structure 
After the reformation, the stadium was upgraded with three sets of covered bleachers, supporting approximately 5,000 seated people, a luxury box, two bars and six bathroom areas. The field was improved with a new type of grass and a new floodlight system. The locker room for athletes and referees was improved. It has six cabins for the news media.

References 

Football venues in Paraíba
Estadio Da Graca
Sports venues completed in 1944